ASA College is a private for-profit college in New York City and Hialeah, Florida. The college has three campuses: Midtown Manhattan and Downtown Brooklyn in New York, and Hialeah in Florida. It offers bachelor's degrees, associate degrees, and professional certificates in the divisions of business administration, health disciplines, legal studies, and computer technology. Although it is accredited by the Middle States Commission on Higher Education, that accreditation will be removed in 2023 as the college has failed to meet several of the commission's standards. The institution closed on March 1, 2023.

History
ASA was founded in 1985 with a professor and 12 students in a small Brooklyn classroom. Known then as 'Advanced Software Analysis', the college focused on computer programming, as New York had a dire shortage of qualified mainframe programmers at that time.

In 1999, ASA received authorization from the New York State Board of Regents to confer degrees in accounting, computer programming, information technology, and medical assisting.

The college's president, Alex Shchegol, was removed by the college's board of trustees in 2018 after multiple allegations of sexual misconduct that resulted in over $2 million in out-of-court settlements. After the board denied his request in late 2021 to be reinstated, he used his power as owner of the college to replace five of the seven members of the board of trustees, and they reinstated him.

In 2022, the U.S. Department of Education began to restrict the college's access to federal financial aid. Later that year, the college's accreditor, the Middle States Commission on Higher Education, announced its intention to stop accrediting the college in 2023. After being accused of "running misleading ads targeting low-income people and immigrants", ASA College agreed to pay over $100,000 to New York City's consumer protection division. It is also the subject of a class-action lawsuit by employees alleging that the college has not paid them. The Middle States Commission on Higher Education has said that the college will close on February 24, 2023, the last day of classes of the college's fall classes; the college has disputed that claim. In spite of the disputed claim, the organization's last day of operation was March 1, 2023.

Accreditations and approvals
ASA College is authorized by the New York State Board of Regents to confer Associate of Occupational Studies and Associate in Applied Science degrees. ASA's associate degree program in Medical Assisting is accredited by the Commission on Accreditation of Allied Health Education Programs upon the recommendation of the Curriculum Review Board of the American Association of Medical Assistants Endowment. ASA is also approved by the New York State Education Department for the training of veterans and is authorized under Federal law to enroll non-immigrant alien students.

The college is accredited by the Middle States Commission on Higher Education. That accreditation will be removed in 2023 as the institution has failed to meet several of the commission's accreditation standards.

Athletics
In 2008, ASA College launched their Athletic program out of their Brooklyn campus  known as the Avengers. Starting with a small basketball team, the athletic department expanded to 13 sports programs combined within three campuses: including men's & women's soccer, varsity & JV football, men & women's basketball, baseball, men's lacrosse, men's & women's track & field and men's & women's tennis. All programs are members of the National Junior College Athletic Association (NJCAA) Division I, Region XV.

Brooklyn Avengers
ASA Brooklyn, known as the Avengers, currently has four sports teams: men's & women's basketball, baseball, and football.

Manhattan Mad Titans
ASA Manhattan, known as the Mad Titans, currently has one sports team: men's basketball. It's speculated that it would add women's basketball.

Miami Silverstorm
ASA Miami, known as the Silver Storm, currently has 13 sports teams: men's & women's soccer, football, men & women's basketball, baseball, cheerleading, men's lacrosse, softball, men & women's track & field, and men & women's tennis.

Accomplishments
Head tennis coach Brian Slack enters his sixth season at the helm of the men's and women's tennis programs at ASA College and his third at ASA College Miami. Slack has won seven NJCAA National Championships, all with ASA College. Four on the men's side and three on the women's side.

Notably, the ASA Miami football program kicked off in 2015 and remained the only junior college football program in the state of Florida. ASA NY played their first season in 2009 and gained national recognition during their 2012–2013 season after being ranked #5 nationally and earning a Carrier Bowl bid against Snow College. During the 2017 season, ASA NY ranked 14th by the NJCAA with a 9–1 regular-season record. ASA NY earned an invite to the Valley of the Sun Bowl in Mesa, Arizona and came away victorious over Mesa Community College 28–23.

References

External links
 Official website
 ASA Brooklyn athletics website
 ASA Manhattan athletics website
 ASA Miami athletics website

For-profit universities and colleges in the United States
Private universities and colleges in New York City
NJCAA athletics
Educational institutions established in 1985
1985 establishments in New York City
Universities and colleges in Manhattan
Universities and colleges in Brooklyn
Universities and colleges in Miami-Dade County, Florida
North Miami Beach, Florida
Private universities and colleges in Florida